Chian or Chi-an may refer to:

An inhabitant of the Greek island of Chios
A member of the Chian diaspora of people dispersed from the island of Chios
Qian (disambiguation), various topics also spelled Chian in the Guoyeu Romatzyh romanisation system
Ji'an (disambiguation), various topics also spelled Chi-an in the Wade–Giles romanisation system
Li Chi-an (born 1945), North Korean footballer

See also

Chain (disambiguation)
China (disambiguation)
Chiang (disambiguation)